Sekai ichi is a cultivar of apples first released from Japan in 1974. Sekai ichi means "world's number one" in Japanese.

Description
'Sekai Ichi' apples are pale pink/red with red stripes; they are juicy, sweet, and not as crisp/crunchy as other cultivars. The variety came from a cross between the varieties 'Red Delicious' and 'Golden Delicious'.

References

Apple cultivars